Srikanth Reddy (born 1973) is an Indian American writer, scholar, and author of three full-length volumes of poetry. His awards include a 2013 NEA fellowship, a 2013 Creative Capital Award, and a 2018 Guggenheim fellowship. Reddy delivered the Bagley Wright Lectures in Poetry in fall 2015, and served as a judge for the 2019 Griffin Poetry Prize.

Life
He earned his BA and his PhD from Harvard, and his MFA from the Iowa Writers' Workshop.
He is currently Professor of English and Creative Writing at the University of Chicago.

His poetry has been published in Jacket, Poetry Northwest, Harper's, and The Guardian, and his literary criticism has appeared in the New York Times, Lana Turner, Raritan, PEN America, and other publications.

In October 2021 Reddy was announced as the editor of Phoenix Poets, a book series published by the University of Chicago Press, and in December 2022 he assumed the role of poetry editor for The Paris Review.

Works

Readings in World Literature Omnidawn Pub., 2012,

References

External links

Living people
Harvard University alumni
University of Chicago faculty
21st-century American poets
1973 births